Anna Kotočová ( Janoštinová; born 6 April 1968, in Trstená) is a Slovak former basketball player who competed for Czechoslovakia in the 1988 Summer Olympics, in the 1992 Summer Olympics, and in the 2000 Summer Olympics.

References

External links
 

1968 births
Living people
People from Trstená
Sportspeople from the Žilina Region
Slovak women's basketball players
Czechoslovak women's basketball players
Olympic basketball players of Czechoslovakia
Olympic basketball players of Slovakia
Basketball players at the 1988 Summer Olympics
Basketball players at the 1992 Summer Olympics
Basketball players at the 2000 Summer Olympics